Malomedvedevsky is a rural locality (a khutor) in Mikhaylovka Urban Okrug, Volgograd Oblast, Russia. The population was 30 as of 2010. There are 3 streets.

Geography 
Malomedvedevsky is located 48 km north of Mikhaylovka. Bolshemedvedevsky is the nearest rural locality.

References 

Rural localities in Mikhaylovka urban okrug